Grzegorz Gajdus (born January 16, 1967 in Skórcz, Pomorskie) is a long-distance runner from Poland, who represented his native country at the 1996 Summer Olympics in Atlanta, Georgia. He ran his personal best (2:09:22) in 2003, when he finished in fourth place at the Eindhoven Marathon.

Marathon achievements

See also
Polish records in athletics

References
 Marathon Info Profile

1967 births
Living people
Polish male long-distance runners
Olympic athletes of Poland
Athletes (track and field) at the 1996 Summer Olympics
People from Starogard County
Sportspeople from Pomeranian Voivodeship